The 2023 season is the 21st season of competitive kickboxing in Romania.

List of events

Road to DFS 1

Road to DFS 1: Lambagiu vs. Guiderdone was a kickboxing and Muay Thai event produced by the Dynamite Fighting Show in association with Thai Boxe Mania that took place on January 28, 2022 at the Palasport di Torino in Turin, Italy.

Background 
A welterweight bout between current ISKA World Middleweight Oriental Rules Champion Christian Guiderdone and Florin Lambagiu headlined the event.

Results

Transilvania Mix Kombat

Transilvania Mix Kombat: Lutaniuc vs. Conea was a kickboxing event produced by the Professional Fight Gym that took place on February 4, 2023 at the Bistrița Arena in Bistrița, Romania.

Results

Dynamite Fighting Show 18

Dynamite Fighting Show 18: Stoica vs. Tok (also known as Final Fight) was a kickboxing event produced by the Dynamite Fighting Show that took place on March 12, 2023 at the Constantin Jude Arena in Timișoara, Romania.

Results

DFS Welterweight Championship Tournament

DFS Heavyweight Championship Tournament

Kombat London 1

Kombat London 1: Lambagiu vs. Childs was a kickboxing, mixed martial arts and boxing event produced by the Kombat London that took place on March 17, 2023, at Harrow Leisure Centre in London, England.

Results

Urban Legend 14

Urban Legend 14: Urban Legend vs. Scorpions Iași is a kickboxing event produced by the Urban Legend that is scheduled to take place on April 1, 2022 at the La Scoica Land in Mamaia, Romania.

Results

Colosseum Tournament 38

Colosseum Tournament 38 is a kickboxing event produced by the Colosseum Tournament that is scheduled to take place on May 5, 2023, at the Dumitru Popescu-Colibași Arena in Brașov, Romania.

Results

Colosseum Tournament 39

Colosseum Tournament 39 is a kickboxing event produced by the Colosseum Tournament in association with Bukovina Museum that is scheduled to take place on June 30, 2023, at the Suceava Fortress in Suceava, Romania.

Results

See also
 2023 in Glory
 2023 in ONE Championship
 2023 in K-1
 2023 in Wu Lin Feng

References

External links
 Colosseumkickboxing.com
 Dynamitefighting.com
 Colosseum Tournament on Facebook
 Dynamite Fighting Show on Facebook
 Golden Fighter Championship on Facebook
 KO Masters on Facebook
 OSS Fighters on Facebook
 Prometheus Fighting Promotion on Facebook

Kickboxing
2023 in kickboxing
Kickboxing in Romania